BCCI may refer to:

 Bank of Credit and Commerce International, a failed bank, 1972–1992
 Board of Control for Cricket in India, the governing body for cricket in India
 Bursa Chamber of Commerce and Industry, a professional association in Bursa, Turkey

See also
 BCI (disambiguation)